The Government of the Community of Madrid (Spanish: Gobierno de la Comunidad de Madrid) is the collegiate body charged with the executive and administrative functions of the autonomous community of Madrid, Spain. Until the 1998 reform of the regional statute it was formally called Council of Government of the Community of Madrid (Consejo de Gobierno de la Comunidad de Madrid).

It is headed by the president of the Community of Madrid, and additionally includes the appointed vice presidents and consejeros (cabinet ministers).

The cabinet ceases in office after the holding of legislative elections, remaining in a caretaking role until a new cabinet assumes office.

Its main headquarters are located at the Royal House of the Post Office (Real Casa de Correos), in the Puerta del Sol.

Cabinets 
 Leguina I (1983–1987)
 Leguina II (1987–1991)
 Leguina III (1991–1995)
 Gallardón I (1995–1999)
 Gallardón II (1999–2003)
 Aguirre I (2003–2007)
 Aguirre II (2007–2011)
 Aguirre III (2011–2012) 
 González (2012–2015)
 Cifuentes (2015–2018)
 Garrido (2018–2019)
 Ayuso I (2019–2021)
Ayuso II (2021–present)

Current composition

References